A mountain is an elevated portion of the Earth's crust, generally with steep sides that show significant exposed bedrock. Although definitions vary, a mountain may differ from a plateau in having a limited summit area, and is usually higher than a hill, typically rising at least 300 metres (1,000 feet) above the surrounding land. A few mountains are isolated summits, but most occur in mountain ranges.

Mountains are formed through tectonic forces, erosion, or volcanism, which act on time scales of up to tens of millions of years. Once mountain building ceases, mountains are slowly leveled through the action of weathering, through slumping and other forms of mass wasting, as well as through erosion by rivers and glaciers.

High elevations on mountains produce colder climates than at sea level at similar latitude. These colder climates strongly affect the ecosystems of mountains: different elevations have different plants and animals. Because of the less hospitable terrain and climate, mountains tend to be used less for agriculture and more for resource extraction, such as mining and logging, along with recreation, such as mountain climbing and skiing.

Definition

There is no universally accepted definition of a mountain. Elevation, volume, relief, steepness, spacing and continuity have been used as criteria for defining a mountain. In the Oxford English Dictionary a mountain is defined as "a natural elevation of the earth surface rising more or less abruptly from the surrounding level and attaining an altitude which, relatively to the adjacent elevation, is impressive or notable."

Whether a landform is called a mountain may depend on local usage.  John Whittow's Dictionary of Physical Geography states "Some authorities regard eminences above  as mountains, those below being referred to as hills."

At one time the US Board on Geographic Names defined a mountain as being  or taller, but has abandoned the definition since the 1970s. Any similar landform lower than this height was considered a hill. However, today, the US Geological Survey concludes that these terms do not have technical definitions in the US.

The UN Environmental Programme's definition of "mountainous environment" includes any of the following:
Using these definitions, mountains cover 33% of Eurasia, 19% of South America, 24% of North America, and 14% of Africa. As a whole, 24% of the Earth's land mass is mountainous.

Geology

There are three main types of mountains: volcanic, fold, and block. All three types are formed from plate tectonics: when portions of the Earth's crust move, crumple, and dive. Compressional forces, isostatic uplift and intrusion of igneous matter forces surface rock upward, creating a landform higher than the surrounding features. The height of the feature makes it either a hill or, if higher and steeper, a mountain. Major mountains tend to occur in long linear arcs, indicating tectonic plate boundaries and activity.

Volcanoes

Volcanoes are formed when a plate is pushed below another plate, or at a mid-ocean ridge or hotspot. When the magma reaches the surface, it often builds a volcanic mountain, such as a shield volcano or a stratovolcano. Examples of volcanoes include Mount Fuji in Japan and Mount Pinatubo in the Philippines. The magma does not have to reach the surface in order to create a mountain: magma that solidifies below ground can still form dome mountains, such as Navajo Mountain in the US.

Fold mountains

Fold mountains occur when two plates collide: shortening occurs along thrust faults and the crust is overthickened. Since the less dense continental crust "floats" on the denser mantle rocks beneath, the weight of any crustal material forced upward to form hills, plateaus or mountains must be balanced by the buoyancy force of a much greater volume forced downward into the mantle. Thus the continental crust is normally much thicker under mountains, compared to lower lying areas. Rock can fold either symmetrically or asymmetrically. The upfolds are anticlines and the downfolds are synclines: in asymmetric folding there may also be recumbent and overturned folds. The Balkan Mountains and the Jura Mountains are examples of fold mountains.

Block mountains

Block mountains are caused by faults in the crust: a plane where rocks have moved past each other. When rocks on one side of a fault rise relative to the other, it can form a mountain. The uplifted blocks are block mountains or horsts. The intervening dropped blocks are termed graben: these can be small or form extensive rift valley systems. This form of landscape can be seen in East Africa, the Vosges and Rhine valley, and the Basin and Range Province of Western North America. These areas often occur when the regional stress is extensional and the crust is thinned.

Erosion

During and following uplift, mountains are subjected to the agents of erosion (water, wind, ice, and gravity) which gradually wear the uplifted area down. Erosion causes the surface of mountains to be younger than the rocks that form the mountains themselves. Glacial processes produce characteristic landforms, such as pyramidal peaks, knife-edge arêtes, and bowl-shaped cirques that can contain lakes. Plateau mountains, such as the Catskills, are formed from the erosion of an uplifted plateau.

Climate

Climate in the mountains becomes colder at high elevations, due to an interaction between radiation and convection. Sunlight in the visible spectrum hits the ground and heats it. The ground then heats the air at the surface.

However, when air is hot, it tends to expand, which lowers its density. Thus, hot air tends to rise and transfer heat upward. This is the process of convection. Convection comes to equilibrium when a parcel of air at a given altitude has the same density as its surroundings. Air is a poor conductor of heat, so a parcel of air will rise and fall without exchanging heat. This is known as an adiabatic process, which has a characteristic pressure-temperature dependence. As the pressure gets lower, the temperature decreases.

The presence of water in the atmosphere complicates the process of convection. Water vapor contains latent heat of vaporization. As air rises and cools, it eventually becomes saturated and cannot hold its quantity of water vapor.
The actual lapse rate can vary by altitude and by location.
Therefore, moving up  on a mountain is roughly equivalent to moving 80 kilometres (45 miles or 0.75° of latitude) towards the nearest pole. This relationship is only approximate, however, since local factors such as proximity to oceans (such as the Arctic Ocean) can drastically modify the climate. As the altitude increases, the main form of precipitation becomes snow and the winds increase.

The effect of the climate on the ecology at an elevation can be largely captured through a combination of amount of precipitation, and the biotemperature, as described by Leslie Holdridge in 1947. Biotemperature is the mean temperature; all temperatures below  are considered to be 0 °C. When the temperature is below 0 °C, plants are dormant, so the exact temperature is unimportant. The peaks of mountains with permanent snow can have a biotemperature below .

Climate change
Mountain environments are particularly sensitive to anthropogenic climate change and are currently undergoing alterations unprecedented in last 10,000 years. In recent decades mountain ice caps and glaciers have experienced accelerating ice loss. The melting of the glaciers, permafrost and snow has caused underlying surfaces to become increasingly unstable. Landslip hazards have increased in both number and magnitude due to climate change.

Alpine ecosystems can also thus be particularly climatically sensitive. Many mid-latitude mountains act as cold climate refugia, with the ecosystems occupying small environmental niches. As well as the direct influence that the change in climate can have on an ecosystem, there is also the indirect one on the soils from changes in stability and soil development.

Patterns of river discharge are also significantly affected by climate change, which in turn has significant impacts on communities that rely on water fed from alpine sources. Nearly half of mountain areas provide essential or supportive water resources for mainly urban populations, in particular during the dry season and in semiarid areas such as in central Asia.

Ecology

The colder climate on mountains affects the plants and animals residing on mountains. A particular set of plants and animals tend to be adapted to a relatively narrow range of climate. Thus, ecosystems tend to lie along elevation bands of roughly constant climate. This is called altitudinal zonation.
In regions with dry climates, the tendency of mountains to have higher precipitation as well as lower temperatures also provides for varying conditions, which enhances zonation.

Some plants and animals found in altitudinal zones tend to become isolated since the conditions above and below a particular zone will be inhospitable and thus constrain their movements or dispersal. These isolated ecological systems are known as sky islands.

Altitudinal zones tend to follow a typical pattern. At the highest elevations, trees cannot grow, and whatever life may be present will be of the alpine type, resembling tundra. Just below the tree line, one may find subalpine forests of needleleaf trees, which can withstand cold, dry conditions. Below that, montane forests grow. In the temperate portions of the earth, those forests tend to be needleleaf trees, while in the tropics, they can be broadleaf trees growing in a rain forest.

Mountains and humans

At very high altitudes, the decreasing atmospheric pressure means that less oxygen is available for breathing, and there is less protection against solar radiation (UV). Above  elevation, there is not enough oxygen to support human life. This is sometimes referred to as the "death zone". The summits of Mount Everest and K2 are in the death zone.

Mountain societies and economies

Mountains are generally less preferable for human habitation than lowlands, because of harsh weather and little level ground suitable for agriculture. While 7% of the land area of Earth is above , only 140 million people live above that altitude and only 20-30 million people above  elevation. About half of mountain dwellers live in the Andes, Central Asia, and Africa.

With limited access to infrastructure, only a handful of human communities exist above  of elevation. Many are small and have heavily specialized economies, often relying on industries such as agriculture, mining, and tourism.

Traditional mountain societies rely on agriculture, with higher risk of crop failure than at lower elevations. Minerals often occur in mountains, with mining being an important component of the economics of some montane societies. More recently, tourism supports mountain communities, with some intensive development around attractions such as national parks or ski resorts. About 80% of mountain people live below the poverty line.

Most of the world's rivers are fed from mountain sources, with snow acting as a storage mechanism for downstream users. More than half of humanity depends on mountains for water.

In geopolitics mountains are often seen as preferable "natural boundaries" between polities.

Mountaineering

Mountain climbing, or alpinism is the sport, hobby or profession of hiking, skiing, and climbing mountains. While mountaineering began as attempts to reach the highest point of unclimbed big mountains it has branched into specializations that address different aspects of the mountain and consists of three areas: rock-craft, snow-craft and skiing, depending on whether the route chosen is over rock, snow or ice. All require experience, athletic ability, and technical knowledge of the terrain to maintain safety.

Mountains as sacred places

Mountains often play a significant role in religion. There are for example a number of sacred mountains within Greece such as Mount Olympus which was held to be the home of the gods. In Japanese culture, the 3,776.24 m (12,389 ft) volcano of Mount Fuji is also held to be sacred with tens of thousands of Japanese ascending it each year. Mount Kailash, in the Tibet Autonomous Region of China, is considered to be sacred in four religions: Hinduism, Bon, Buddhism, and Jainism. In Ireland, pilgrimages are made up the  Mount Brandon by Irish Catholics. The Himalayan peak of Nanda Devi is associated with the Hindu goddesses Nanda and Sunanda; it has been off-limits to climbers since 1983. Mount Ararat is a sacred mountain, as it is believed to be the landing place of Noah's Ark. In Europe and especially in the Alps, summit crosses are often erected on the tops of prominent mountains.

Superlatives

Heights of mountains are typically measured above sea level. The highest mountains above sea level are generally not the highest above the surrounding terrain. There is no precise definition of surrounding base, but Denali, Mount Kilimanjaro and Nanga Parbat are possible candidates for the tallest mountain on land by this measure.

The highest mountains are not generally the most voluminous. Mauna Loa is the largest mountain on Earth in terms of base area (about ) and volume (about ). Mount Kilimanjaro is the largest non-shield volcano in terms of both base area and volume.  Mount Logan is the largest non-volcanic mountain in base area.

The highest mountains above sea level are also not those with peaks farthest from the centre of the Earth, because the figure of the Earth is not spherical. Sea level closer to the equator is several miles farther from the centre of the Earth. The summit of Chimborazo, Ecuador's tallest mountain, is usually considered to be the farthest point from the Earth's centre, although the southern summit of Peru's tallest mountain, Huascarán, is another contender. Both have elevations above sea level more than  less than that of Everest.

See also

 List of mountain ranges
 List of peaks by prominence
 List of ski areas and resorts
 Lists of mountains
 
 Seven Summits

References

 
Geography terminology
Earth's crust